Three ships of the Royal Navy have borne the name HMS Sutherland:

 HMS Sutherland was a fourth rate of 54 guns launched in 1704 as HMS Reserve. She served as a hospital ship in the Mediterranean 1741, and was condemned in 1744. She was broken up in 1754.
  was a 50-gun fourth rate launched in 1741 and sold in 1770.
  is a Type 23 frigate launched in 1996 and on active service as of 2017.

Fictional ship
HMS Sutherland also is the name of a fictional, Dutch-built, 74-gun ship of the line that appears in the Horatio Hornblower novels.

Battle honours
Ships named Sutherland have earned the following battle honours:
Louisburg 1758
Quebec 1759
Martinique 1762
Havana 1762

Royal Navy ship names